Bumby or Bumbie may refer to:

 Walter Bumby, British rugby player
 Bumby, the nickname of Jack Hemingway, son of the author Ernest Hemingway
 Doctor Bumby, a character in the video game Alice: Madness Returns.
 Bumbie, The Dearest Deer, a fictional film from the cartoon "Bumbie's Mom", part of an episode of Animaniacs.
 Within the 2017 virtual reality game ‘’Rush of Blood’’ the main enemy on the fourth level is referred to as bumby due to her ability to produce “Bumby Scares”.